Coccodentalium is a genus of molluscs belonging to the family Dentaliidae.

The species of this genus are found in Europe, America and Southeastern Asia.

Species:

Coccodentalium cancellatum 
Coccodentalium carduus 
Coccodentalium gemmiparum 
Coccodentalium radula

References

Molluscs